Eastern Air Lines Flight 935 was a scheduled commercial passenger flight operated by Eastern Air Lines. On September 22, 1981, the Lockheed L-1011 TriStar jet operating the flight suffered an uncontained engine failure which led to a loss of 3 out of the 4 hydraulic systems aboard the aircraft at an altitude of  MSL. The crew were able to land the aircraft safely to an emergency landing at John F. Kennedy International Airport with some limited use of the outboard spoilers, the inboard ailerons and the horizontal stabilizer, plus differential engine power of the remaining two engines. There were no injuries.

Aircraft
The plane was a Lockheed L-1011 Tristar, registration  C/n / msn: 1010, fitted with Rolls-Royce RB211-22B turbofan engines, delivered in July 1972. In April 1973 and 1974, the plane was leased to Trans World Airlines under the same registration. It was en route from Newark Liberty International Airport in New Jersey to Luis Muñoz Marín International Airport, in San Juan, Puerto Rico.

Aftermath
The aircraft, N309EA, was repaired and returned to service until it was retired in 1988. In 1989, the aircraft was sold to Air Transat and re-registered as C-FTNB. The aircraft was scrapped in 2001.

See also
United Airlines Flight 232
Flight with disabled controls

References

Accidents and incidents involving the Lockheed L-1011
935
Aviation accidents and incidents in the United States in 1981
Aviation accidents and incidents in New York City
September 1981 events in the United States
1981 in New York City
Aviation accidents and incidents in 1981
Airliner accidents and incidents caused by engine failure
Airliner accidents and incidents involving uncontained engine failure